Siam Paragon is a shopping mall in Bangkok, Thailand. It is one of the largest malls in Thailand, along with IconSiam, CentralWorld and CentralPlaza WestGate.

Siam Paragon includes a range of specialty stores and restaurants as well as a multiplex (15 large screen cinemas), the Sea Life Bangkok Ocean World aquarium, an exhibition hall, the Thai Art Gallery, and an opera concert hall. It also has a bowling alley and karaoke centre. It is a joint venture by Siam Piwat, the company that owns the adjacent Siam Center/Siam Discovery shopping malls, and The Mall Group, which owns The Emporium. Siam Paragon's financial results are not reported by the privately held Siam Paragon Development.

History

Siam Paragon was built on the former site of the Siam Intercontinental Hotel, which was demolished in 2002 at the end of its lease. The site, leased for 30 years, is Crown Property Bureau land and at one time was the royal parkland of Sa Pathum Palace. The mall opened on 9 December 2005 at a cost of about 15 billion baht or US$450 million. It covers an area of 52 .

Location
Siam Paragon is on Rama I Road in Pathum Wan District, adjacent to other shopping areas. It is next door to Siam Center and Siam Discovery Center and opposite Siam Square. MBK Center is also nearby. An elevated walkway beneath the BTS Skytrain tracks links Siam Paragon to the Ratchaprasong intersection, where CentralWorld, Gaysorn and several other shopping malls and hotels are located.

Transportation
 BTS Skytrain Sukhumvit and Silom Lines – Siam station has a skybridge linked to Siam Paragon's M floor.
 Parking – 100,000 square metres, accommodating 4,000 cars.

Department store and retail shops

The Paragon Department Store occupies 50,000 square metres. Another 40,000 square metres are devoted to retail shops selling goods ranging from apparel to groceries to expensive automobiles.

Thai traditional art
There is a section of Thai traditional arts shops offering a range of decorative silk, ivory and antique items.

Royal Paragon Hall
The Royal Paragon Hall is a 12,000 square metre events facility, with a capacity of 5,000 persons suitable for concerts, conventions, and special exhibitions.

Hotel

Energy footprint

Siam Paragon consumes roughly 123 GWh of electricity a year (2011). By comparison, over the same period, Mae Hong Son Province's quarter-million inhabitants used 65 GWh.

See also
 List of shopping malls in Thailand
 List of largest shopping malls in Thailand

References

External links

 Paragon Cineplex
 Royal Paragon Hall
The Pride of Bangkok

Shopping malls in Bangkok
The Mall Group
Pathum Wan district
Shopping malls established in 2005
Thai companies established in 2005
Food halls